OER may stand for:

OER - the IATA airport code for Örnsköldsvik Airport in Örnsköldsvik, Sweden
Open educational resources, open documents that are useful for teaching, learning, educational, assessment and research purposes.
Offense efficiency rating, the average number of points scored per shot by a basketball player.
Oregon Electric Railway, an interurban railroad line in Oregon, United States.
Odakyu Electric Railway, a Japanese railway company.
Oxygen enhancement ratio, effect magnitude of ionizing radiation due to the presence of oxygen.
Oxygen Evolution Reaction, the formation of oxygen by electrochemical reduction of water.
Officer Evaluation Report, an evaluation form used by the United States Army.

See also

Oer